Menai Bridge railway station was situated  west of Bangor, Gwynedd in Wales.

History
Opened on 1 October 1858 it was a replacement for the earlier Britannia Bridge station, named after the bridge of the same name which crosses the nearby Menai Strait a couple of hundred metres to the north.

The station was opened by the Chester and Holyhead Railway Company at the point where the main Chester to Holyhead line met the Bangor and Carnarvon Railway. There were four platforms, two for each line and two which formed an Island platform. The main station building was a large brick built one whilst there was a brick waiting shelter on the island platform.

Closure

The station closed to passenger services on 14 February 1966. In 1966 the Caernarfon line was switched to single track. On 4 August 1969 it closed to goods services. On 5 January 1970 the line also closed to passenger services. It was brought back into use for container traffic after 23 May 1970 Britannia Bridge fire. The bridge was repaired and re-opened on 30 January 1972. After that date the Caernarfon line closed for good and was lifted. The North Wales Coast Line runs through the site of the station (and becomes single track there) but no visible remains of it can be seen.

References

Further reading

Disused railway stations in Gwynedd
Former London and North Western Railway stations
Railway stations in Great Britain opened in 1858
Railway stations in Great Britain closed in 1966
Beeching closures in Wales
Pentir